WYCY (105.3 FM) is a radio station broadcasting a classic hits music format. Licensed to Hawley, Pennsylvania, United States, the station is currently owned by Bold Gold Media Group, L.P. and features programming from Citadel Media.

History
WYCY began in September 1993 as "Y105 The Best Mix". The station was then owned by Banner Broadcasting and its format was Adult Contemporary. In the mid- to late 1990s, it was sold and became Sunny 105, an oldies station. In early 2010 WYCY changed its name to Classic Hits 105.3, and now features more uptempo rock music. The station broadcasts to the Pocono Lake Region of Wayne and Pike Counties, Pennsylvania. It, along with its sister stations 95-3 DNH (WDNH-FM) and Headline News Radio 104.3 FM & 1590 AM (WPSN), are the heritage stations serving the local communities.

References

External links

YCY
Wayne County, Pennsylvania
Classic hits radio stations in the United States
Radio stations established in 2010